This is a list of Norwegian television related events from 2003.

Events
January - The Norwegian version of Pop Idol debuts on TV2.
15 May - Eva Lill Baukhol wins series 3 of Big Brother Norway.
23 May - Kurt Nielsen wins the first series of Idol.
May - Release date of Kurt Nilsen's debut single, "She's So High".

Debuts
January 2003 - Idol (2003-2007, 2011–present)

Television shows

Ending this year

Big Brother Norway (2001-2003, 2011)

Births

Deaths

See also
2003 in Norway